is a Japanese table tennis player. She won a bronze medal with Honoka Hashimoto at the 2019 World Table Tennis Championships.

ITTF results

Singles

Doubles

Career records
Doubles
World Championships: 3rd (2019).
Asian Championships: 3rd (2017, 2019).
Asian Junior and Cadet Championships: 3rd (2015)

Team
World Team Cup: 2nd (2019)
Asian Championships: 2nd (2017, 2019).
Asian Junior and Cadet Championships: 2nd (2014, 2015)

References

External links

Japanese female table tennis players
1997 births
Living people
World Table Tennis Championships medalists